The R261 road is a regional road in Ireland. It is a loop road from the N56 road on the Loughrea Peninsula in County Donegal. The road forms part of the Wild Atlantic Way.

The R261 travels west from the N56 at Maas to a minor road leading to the beach villages of Narin and Portnoo. From this junction the road travels south, passing the megalithic tombs of Kilclooney More, to rejoin the N56 at Ardara.

References

Regional roads in the Republic of Ireland
Roads in County Donegal